The Cabinet of Lesotho is the most senior level of the executive branch of the Government of Lesotho. It consists of the Prime Minister, the Deputy Prime Minister, and the Ministers.

Composition

On 4 November 2022, the cabinet of Prime Minister Sam Matekane was sworn in. The number of ministries had been reduced from 26 to 15. The following table denotes the current composition of the national cabinet, as of November 2022:

References

External links
Cabinet – Government of Lesotho

Lesotho
Government of Lesotho